The Chapel of St Domenica is a Roman Catholic chapel in Dingli, Malta, which is dedicated to Saint Domenica. It was built in the 17th century.

History 
The chapel of St Domenica was established in 1669 by the nobleman Marc'Antonio Inguanez, and it was constructed on his lands as jus patronatus. It is annexed to the garden of Diar il-Bniet.

Today, Mass is celebrated within the chapel once a year. The building is listed on the National Inventory of the Cultural Property of the Maltese Islands.

Architecture 
The chapel is small and it has a simple façade which includes a rectangular door and window, flanked by flat pilasters with Doric capitals on either side. Above the pilasters there is an entablature and a triangular pediment which is topped by a small stone cross. The chapel has a single altar.

References

External links 
 

1669 establishments in Malta
Dingli
Limestone churches in Malta
National Inventory of the Cultural Property of the Maltese Islands
Roman Catholic chapels in Malta
Roman Catholic churches completed in 1669
17th-century Roman Catholic church buildings in Malta